La Une is a Belgian national television channel, owned and operated by the French-language public-service broadcasting organization RTBF. La Une is the equivalent of Flemish station Eén, of the Flemish broadcaster VRT.

History

INR 
Experimental television was born in Belgium June 2, 1953 with the live broadcast of the coronation of Queen Elizabeth II of the United Kingdom.

On 31 October at 20:30 from Studio 5 of Le Flagey, the headquarters of the National Institute of Belgian Radio (INR), Andrée Rolin officially opened the channel. After that, the announcer Janine Lambotte opens the broadcast with the new experimental television just born and broadcast 2 hours a day, 6 days a week. Transmission began with the French television news relayed by the RTF transmitter TV-Lille (France's first regional station), followed by the broadcast of the cabaret type and called Boum.

In the early days, the INR broadcast two to three evenings per week, with a strong focus on theatre and drama, and is released on Friday and during the holidays. On Wednesday and Sunday evenings, the channel broadcast its own productions. The rest of the programming was provided by RTF. The first live sports coverage began with the FIFA World Cup 1954 and Monday sports from 1955. The first newscast premièred on September 1, 1956, produced entirely in Brussels and with almost no pictures, except of the presenter reading the script.

The weather report already exists. For several years, it is in the form of animated cartoons corresponding to the time announced. These drawings are executed at the Royal Meteorological Institute Live from the frosted glass leaving only to see the drawing, a character with an umbrella or a radiant sun on bathers, etc. ... done by Bob Boudard, a whimsical cabaret with a talented cartoonist (and also capable of whistling and interpret various musical pieces). Hidden behind the frosted screen, Boudard must interpret the bulletin theft when he arrived at the institute, often at the last minute by taxi drivers who have learned to know and who are ready to go to bring in time because it has various obligations that occupy Brussels, among others hold its street cafe "Dominicans", visit many actors from the theaters of Brussels city centre.

The Brussels World's Fair in 1958 gave the INR an opportunity to strengthen its new television networks and supersede radio. The panel "Belgian experimental television" disappears from the screen, buses capture vest, Magazine Expo is broadcast daily for six months, and days of release and interruption during the holidays disappear. Every day, reports, interviews, debates and animations make the report of activities of the Expo '58. Investigations and Reports section introduces the first major magazine on Belgian television: Neuf Millions (Nine Million).

In 1953, there were only 6,500 television sets in Belgium. The INR transmitters were then located at the Palais de Justice in Brussels and limited to a radius of 40 km reach. It was not until 1954 for transmitters in Liège and 1958 in Wavre, which can cover almost 96% of the French-speaking territory. In 1956, there were over 100,000 television sets, and in 1960, it reached the 70,000 viewers, throughout Belgium.

RTB 
In 1960, the Harmel Act replaced the National Institute of Broadcasting by Radio-Télévision Belge (RTB). The new facility included a Dutch public broadcaster (Belgische Radio en Televisie or BRT), a French public broadcaster (Radio-Télévision Belge or RTB) and an institution of common services. Both broadcasters are independent of each other and have full cultural autonomy, an organic vis-à-vis independence from the government and the guarantee of freedom of information. RTB/BRT is headed by a program director appointed by the King.

In 1962, cable was introduced in Liège and Namur and was later rolled out throughout the country in 1975, ending the monopoly of public television. Numerous programmes premiered such as Le Jardin Extraordinaire (1965), Le Week-end sportif (1967), the live broadcast of the Tour de France, the first political debates and election night and major reports abroad. In 1971, the RTB began its color transmission with Le Jardin extraordinaire and the News in 1973.

In 1977, a second television channel was created, RTbis, and the decentralization of production took place with the creation of regional centres in Liège and Charleroi. A new Production Centre was established in Brussels in 1979.

RTBF 1 

RTB became the Belgian Radio and Television of the French Community (RTBF) in 1977 by the decree of the Cultural Council of the French Community. RTBF offered cultural autonomy, a monopoly of radio and television broadcasting, freedom of information and of independence from the government. RTBF is governed by a Board of Directors whose members are elected in accordance with policy distributions within the Cultural Council. The Chief Executive is appointed by the Cultural Council.

The first television channel of the RTBF was renamed RTBF 1.

In 1983, RTL Television was launched and obtained the authorization of a radio relay between Luxembourg and Brussels; in compensation, RTBF receives access to non-commercial advertising in 1984. Financial contributions and the quote on the screen of commercial sponsors will be permitted in exceptional cases in 1987 to allow the RTBF to organise the Eurovision Song Contest. The decree of the French Community authorizing the dissemination of commercial advertising by commercial channel RTL-TVI in 1988 put an end to the monopoly of broadcasting of the RTBF, but in 1989 another decree of the French Community authorizes the broadcast by RTBF advertisements trade to rebalance the situation. Management and marketing of advertising space is entrusted to TVB, a joint venture of public and private channels of the French Community (RTBF 1, Télé 21 and RTL-TVI). TVB, divided the advertising revenue between the two channels by 25% to 75% for RTBF and RTL. The system was later criticized from all sides and was discontinued in 1996.

RTBF La Une 
In 1997, the Parlement de la Communauté française made RTBF an autonomous public company, with RTBF 1 being renamed RTBF La 1 along with RTBF 21 into RTBF La 2. RTBF La Une became the first Belgian television channel to broadcast 24 hours a day, unlike its Flemish counterpart, BRTN TV1 (now known as één) which closed down during the day. During the FIFA World Cup 1998, RTBF decided to air all matches on its two main channels, La 1 and La 2. So that the wider public had access to the full coverage, it later redistributed to transmitters that transmitted La Une and La Deux on cable networks and also by analogue terrestrial, throughout Wallonia. This scheme continued after the World Cup.

Visual identity (logo) 
In September 1985, the yellow numeral 1 appeared, and as a result, a new CGI look was created. The start-up and closedown video represents an environment made of geometric figures, while the intro of Journal Télévisé shows a 3D view of the district where the Reyers Tower is located. The packaging was slightly modified in 1989, to mark the start of commercial advertising on RTBF.

5 years later, to the day, the entire look is redone, from its general identity to the promos. A blue ring was added to the back of the stylized yellow "1" and the new design is based on a play of Chinese shadows on a blue background to give the channel a little more relief and a more modern style. JT's intro is similar to the previous one, without the buildings in 3D and with a more transparent Reyers Tower.

In September 1992, 4 rectangles are added to the extant logo. A new look, created by the OLM agency, is implemented, including the logo and photographs of the various hosts and presenters of the channel. JT's new is more simplistic: the components of the logo come alive and a globe is added in the blue circle.

A new intro for JT is used at the beginning of 1994. It depicts the Reyers Tower projecting rays of light at the top of the Earth.

Between 1994 and 1996, several looks follow one another, including one with floating squares.

A new, more abstract logo appeared in September 1996, retiring the yellow numeral 1. The look showcases the new logo in different environments. It was later replaced replaced from March 1997 by a graphically similar look, but featuring a first version of the chip look.

The new logos of the RTBF channels arrived in September 1997. It features a chip design. The idents and the promos contain accelerated images of road trips. The new JT intro, however, was only from December, featuring nocturnal aerial views of the Reyers Tower.

In January 2000, a new look was adopted, with some modifications in 2002 and 2003. This look will be the last to contain versions for start-ups and closedowns, while the previous one did not.

On January 26, 2004, the current logo appears. The first look with this logo features a pointer. The new JT intro features the rotating Earth on a reddish-white background. This intro was changed in 2005.

On March 21, 2011, a new JT intro appears for the first time. In December of that same year, a new 3D look also appeared.

On March 21, 2016, the JT intro changes again. The GRAPHICS are the same, but with a few changes and the reappearance of the red square for La Une newscasts, and a pink circle for La Deux newscasts.

On September 3, 2018, the news got a makeover. A whole new studio, a whole new intro. But also a second new set for, among others, On n'est pas des pigeons!, Jeudi en bonus and STUDIO FOOT.

La Une 
In January 2004, RTBF La 1 was renamed La Une. In March 2011, La Une ceased broadcasting on analogue along with La Deux and La Trois.

Availability 
La Une is available in Brussels and Wallonia via Digital Terrestrial (DVB-T), cable (VOO & Telenet), satellite via TéléSAT and Belgacom TV (IPTV).

In Flanders, prior to the digital switchover, La Une was also available in certain cities near the Walloon border in the following provinces: Flemish Brabant, East Flanders, Limburg, Antwerp and West Flanders via analogue terrestrial, due to the terrestrial spillover.  La Une is also available in Flanders, TéléSAT and TV Vlaanderen via Satellite, Proximus Pickx, Telenet and Voo.

La Une is available in Luxembourg via spillover from neighbouring Wallonia as well as via pay-TV providers Luxembourg Online and Tango.

References

External links 
 Official site of La Une
 Official site of RTBF

1953 establishments in Belgium
French-language television stations in Belgium
Television channels in Belgium
Television channels and stations established in 1953